Grottaglie is a town and comune in the province of Taranto, Apulia, in southern Italy.

Geography

Grottaglie is located in the Salento peninsula, dividing the Adriatic sea from Ionian sea. The countryside around the city is scattered with vast and deep ravines in the limestone that underlies the peninsula. The urban core of Grottaglie is surrounded by these ravines.

History
There is evidence of settlement in the region since the Paleolithic era. The name Grottaglie derives from the Latin Cryptae Aliae, meaning "many ravines". The ancestral part of the town was one of the citadels in the area, referred to in Medieval documents as Casale Cryptalerum, founded by locals sheltering in the caves of the ravines due to coastal Saracen raids.

The fief of Grottaglie was donated by the Norman overlords to the archbishopric of Taranto in the 11th century. In the 14th century the ecclesiastic administration provided the fief with fortifications, walls, a fortress known as the Archbishop's Castle as well as with the Chiesa Matrice ("Mother church").

Since the 15th-17th centuries the jurisdiction over Grottaglie fief was split between the ecclesiastic administration (civil law) and the lay feudal lords (criminal law, Cicinelli-Caracciolo family). Fights between these two competing authorities and periodic revolts by the heavily-taxed population were the leit-motiv of Grottaglie's history until the abolition of feudalism in 1806. After the Italian unification, Grottaglie had the first urban expansion outside its Medieval walls.

Main sights
 Castello Episcopio, massive 13th-century castle
 Chiesa Matrice, main church of the town, built in 1379
 Oratory of the Confraternity of the Purgatory
 Palazzo Cicinelli, a massive Baroque style building on the main square; the palazzo was the seat of the Dukes of Grottaglie also princes of Cursi and Princes of the Holy Roman Empire, hence the residence of the feudal lords of the town on the grant of Bohemond I.
 Palazzo Urselli, which maintains the original Renaissance (pre-Baroque) façade, with a massive 15th century gate and a decorated internal courtyard.
 Palazzo Blasi dates back to the XVII century. It has a Baroque façade, although there are many elements added later to the original building. 
 Palazzo Maggiulli-Cometa, a structure similar to Palazzo Urselli's
 Palazzo de Felice, 18th-century palace and ancestral home of the de Felice family
 San Francesco di Paola, baroque monastery, a masterpiece of architecture with a cloiste 
 Chiesa del Carmine, housing a 1530 stone nativity scene sculpted by Stefano da Putignano

Culture
Folkloristic and religious events include the commemoration-day of St. Cyrus and Easter-period when the Medieval-rooted confraternal religious orders perform their processions during the days of the Holy Week (Easter rituals include procession and pilgrimage of confrères called “Bubble-Bubble” (Italian: BBubbli BBubbli) through the streets of country).

Other events include: 
 The exhibition Ceramica nel Quartiere delle Ceramiche
 The Mediterranean ceramics contest, theatrical and musical events
 Promotion of dessert grapes, months of July, August, and September
 Exhibition - contest about ceramic crib scene during the months of December and January
 Musica Mundi – international festival of ethnic music in July

Economy
Grapes and ceramics-industry are two traditional elements of the local economy since the times of Greater Greece.

The numerous ceramic finds, tracing back to the Classical Age and kept in the National Museum of "Magna Grecia" in Taranto, reveal the antique roots of this handicrafts production which was privileged by the presence of considerable amounts of clay in the surrounding territory. More recently, records dating back to the 18th century report at the time 42 companies in Grottaglie operating in the ceramics-sector with a total of 5,000 employees. In addition to ceramics, also agricultural products such as olive oil and excellent choice dessert grapes are of great importance.

Alenia Composite is a factory of Alenia group producing parts for the Boeing 787.

References

External links
 

Cities and towns in Apulia
Localities of Salento